Eye Mohini (Sun City Girls Singles Volume 3) is a compilation album by American experimental rock band Sun City Girls, released on March 19, 2013 by Abduction Records. It comprises tracks previously released as singles and on various artists compilation albums.

Track listing

Personnel
Adapted from the Eye Mohini (Sun City Girls Singles Volume 3) liner notes.

Sun City Girls
 Alan Bishop – bass guitar, acoustic guitar, electric guitar, vocals
 Richard Bishop – electric guitar, acoustic guitar, lap steel guitar, vocals
 Charles Gocher – drums, percussion, vocals

Production and additional personnel
 Scott Colburn – recording
 Tom Connell – recording
 Eddy Detroit – congas
 Sun City Girls – recording, design
 Kate Widdows – design

Release history

References 

2013 compilation albums
Sun City Girls albums